Natasha Sajé (born June 6, 1955, in Munich, Germany) is an American poet.

Life
She grew up in New York City, and New Jersey. She graduated from the University of Virginia, Johns Hopkins, and the University of Maryland, College Park.

She teaches at Westminster College. and Vermont College.

Her work appeared in The New York Times, The Gettysburg Review, The Kenyon Review, New Republic, Parnassus, Ploughshares, Shenandoah, and The Writers Chronicle.

Awards
 2020 Pushcart Prize XLIV
 2015 15 Bytes Award, Vivarium
 2008 Alice Fay Di Castagnola Award
 2004 Utah Poetry Book of the Year, Bend
 1993 Agnes Lynch Starrett Poetry Prize, Red Under the Skin
 Towson State Prize in Literature

Books

Poetry
 , 2nd printing 1996
 
 The Art of the Novel. 2004.

Criticism

Creative Nonfiction

Other works

References

External links
 "Author's website"
 "Trinity University Press Page for Terroir, Love out of Place"
 "Poet Natasha Sajé reads for the Spring 2020 issue of RHINO literary magazine"
 "Interview with Fiona Sze-Lorrain (Greta Aart): Natasha Sajé", Emprize Review
 Down to ‘The Wire’

German emigrants to the United States
Agnes Lynch Starrett Poetry Prize winners
University of Virginia alumni
Johns Hopkins University alumni
University of Maryland, College Park alumni
Vermont College of Fine Arts faculty
Living people
American women poets
Writers from Munich
20th-century American poets
20th-century American women writers
21st-century American poets
21st-century American women writers
American women academics
1955 births